Geoffrey Rose (born 1932) is an English actor and thriller writer. Born in London, he was raised in Cheshire and Kent. After leaving school, he studied at an acting academy and subsequently was a professional actor for nearly five decades. He wrote three thrillers in the mid-1970s, all of which received praise from critics. These are: Nobody On the Road (1972), A Clear Road to Archangel (1973), and The Bright Adventure (1975).

Possibly his best known acting role was as Arthur Ashton, the headmaster who married Jessie Seaton, in When the Boat Comes In.

References

External links
 

1932 births
Living people
Male actors from London
20th-century English novelists
English male actors